Fields Spring State Park is a  public recreation area in the northwest United States, located in southeastern Washington on State Route 129,  south of Anatone.

Near the tripoint with Idaho and Oregon, the state park offers various routes to the top of Puffer Butte and its scenic views of the Wallowa Mountains and the Grande Ronde River and Snake River basins. The park was initially developed by members of the local chapter of the Isaac Walton League and workers with the Works Progress Administration.

Activities and amenities
The park features camping, trails for hiking, biking, and cross-country skiing, athletic fields, and picnicking facilities as well as the Puffer Butte and Wohelo retreat centers.

In the late 1950s and early 1960s, a rope tow for alpine skiing was operated at the park by a private ski club.

References

External links
Fields Spring State Park Washington State Parks and Recreation Commission 
Fields Spring State Park Map Washington State Parks and Recreation Commission

Parks in Asotin County, Washington
State parks of Washington (state)
Protected areas established in 1930
Works Progress Administration in Washington (state)